Béthanie tram stop is located on line  of the tramway de Bordeaux.

Situation
The station is located on the avenue Roul in Talence.

Junctions 
There are no junctions with other tram lines or buses at this station.

Close by 
 Université Bordeaux 1
 Clinique Béthanie

See also 
 TBC
 Tramway de Bordeaux

External links 
 

Bordeaux tramway stops
Tram stops in Talence
Railway stations in France opened in 2004